T38 and CP8 are disability sport classification for disability athletics intended for people with cerebral palsy.  It includes people who have coordination impairments such as hypertonia, ataxia and athetosis.  Runners in this class may appear to have a slight limp when they are running but otherwise have a stride similar to able-bodied runners. Events for this class include  100 meters, 400 meters, 1,500 meters, and the long jump.

Sport

This classification is for disability athletics. This classification is one of seven classifications for athletes with cerebral palsy.  Similar classifications are T32, T33,  T34, T35, T36, T37 and T38.  The T35 to T38 classes are classes for ambulant sportspeople. The Australian Paralympic Committee defines this classification as being for "Minimal hemiplegia, ataxia, diplegia or athetosis. May have minimal co-ordination problems, good balance. Runs and jumps freely." The International Paralympic Committee defined this classification on their website in July 2016 as, "Coordination impairments (hypertonia, ataxia and athetosis)".  They then go into more detail saying, "Athletes have clear evidence of hypertonia, ataxia and/or athetosis on physical assessment that will affect running. Co-ordination impairment is mild to moderate and can be in one to four limbs. Co-ordination and balance are typically mildly affected, and overall these athletes are able to run and jump freely."

Disability groups 
Multiple types of disabilities are eligible to compete in this class. This class includes people who have cerebral palsy, or who have had a stroke or traumatic brain injury.

Cerebral palsy

CP8 

In athletic events, CP8 competitors participate T38/F38 classes. In athletics, the form used in racing appears similar to able-bodied competitors, but should have some sort of visible limp. The class participates in jumping events.

Cerebral Palsy-International Sports and Recreation Association defined this class in January 2005 as, "Minimal involvement 27 This class is for the minimally affected diplegic Spasticity Grade 1; hemiplegic Spasticity Grade 1: monoplegic; minimal athetoid/ataxic athlete. According to point 1.2 the athlete must have an obvious impairment of function evident during classification. This athlete may appear to have near normal function when running but the athlete must demonstrate a limitation in function to classifiers based on evidence of spasticity (increased tone), ataxic, athetoid or dystonic movements while performing on the field of play or in training." This is general manifested as spasticity in at least one limb. They are able to freely engage in a number of sport related motions including jumping.  They also tend to have good balance and have minimal issues with coordination. People in this class tend to have energy expenditure similar to people without cerebral palsy.

Les Autres 
People with Les Autres related disabilities also compete in this class because of their hypertonia, ataxia and/or athetosis.

Rules and performance 
Athletes in this class are not required to use a starting block.  It is up to the individual.  They have the option to start from a crouch, from a standing position or 3 point stance. In track events, officials are encouraged to avoid keeping these athletes in the starting block too long.  Because of their condition, athletes may make movements that normally would disqualify them as a false start.  If an official believes movement could be a result of this, they can restart the entire field without disqualifying any runners.

History 
The classification was created by the International Paralympic Committee  and has roots in a 2003 attempt to address "the overall objective to support and co-ordinate the ongoing development of accurate, reliable, consistent and credible sport focused classification systems and their implementation." For the 2016 Summer Paralympics in Rio, the International Paralympic Committee had a zero classification at the Games policy.  This policy was put into place in 2014, with the goal of avoiding last minute changes in classes that would negatively impact athlete training preparations. All competitors needed to be internationally classified with their classification status confirmed prior to the Games, with exceptions to this policy being dealt with on a case-by-case basis. In case there was a need for classification or reclassification at the Games despite best efforts otherwise, athletics classification was scheduled for September 4 and September 5 at Olympic Stadium.  For sportspeople with physical or intellectual disabilities going through  classification or reclassification in Rio, their in competition observation event is their first appearance in competition at the Games.

Events 

The class participates in 100 metres, 400 metres, 1,500 metres, and the long jump. They may also participate in the 4 × 100 metres relay with other T35-38 class athletes, however no more than two T38-classified athletes are permitted per relay team. Many events have their own qualifying standards for participation.

Governance 
Classification into this class is handled by the International Paralympic Committee.  For national events, classification is handled by the national athletics organization.

Becoming classified
Athletes with cerebral palsy or similar impairments who wish to compete in para-athletics competition must first undergo a classification assessment. During this, they both undergo a bench test of muscle coordination and demonstrate their skills in athletics, such as running, jumping or throwing. A determination is then made as to what classification an athlete should compete in. Classifications may be Confirmed or Review status. For athletes who do not have access to a full classification panel, Provisional classification is available; this is a temporary Review classification, considered an indication of class only, and generally used only in lower levels of competition.

Competitors
Notable competitors in this class include T38 Australian sprinter Tim Sullivan.  At the home hosted 2000 Summer Paralympics, he won three gold medals. Australian athletics competitors in this class include Evan O'Hanlon, Tim Sullivan and Katy Parrish.

References

Parasports classifications